The Cicognini National Boarding School is a private Catholic primary and secondary school located in Prato, Tuscany, Italy.

Boarding school history
The Cicognini National Boarding School of Prato is the oldest educational institution in the city. Founded in 1692 by Jesuit priests, it was the center of culture in the Grand Duchy of Tuscany, the Kingdom of Italy, and the Italian Republic. Cicognini National Boarding School remains a cultural and training centre for Italy, with significant influence in Tuscany and the metropolitan area of Prato-Florence-Pistoia.

Interior
The school contains a theater dedicated to Gabriele D'Annunzio, with frescoes decorating the ceiling and stage. The school also houses the Chapel of the Boarders, with a Baroque altar, Madonna, organ, and paintings.  The school's refectory is decorated by frescoes as well, and its reception room has a painting dedicated to Gabriele D'Annunzio.

Notable alumni 

 Gabriele D'Annunzio, (1863–1938) –  writer, poet, journalist, and political activist who attended the Cicognini National High School from 1874 to 1881
 Sem Benelli – writer and playwright
 Giovanni Bertini
 Ranieri de' Calzabigi – poet and librettist
 Carlo Azeglio Ciampi – President of the Republic
 Girolamo Lagomarsini, (1698–1773) – humanist and philologist
 Giovanni Lami – jurist, historian, and antiquarian
 Tommaso Landolfi – writer, translator and literary critic
 Curzio Malaparte, (1898–1957) – journalist, dramatist, writer, and diplomat who was born in Prato
 Marcello Pera – Senate President
 Bettino Ricasoli – statesman

Gallery

See also 

 List of schools in Italy
 List of Jesuit schools
 Liceo Classico

External links

Boarding schools in Italy
Jesuit primary schools in Italy
Schools in Tuscany
1692 establishments in Italy
Educational institutions established in the 1690s
Jesuit secondary schools in Italy